Jacky Duguépéroux (born 2 January 1948) is a French football manager and former player. He has been manager of RC Strasbourg, for whom he also played, on three occasions. Between his final two terms, he managed Tunisian side Espérance.

Honours

As a player
Strasbourg
Division 1 1978–79

As a coach
Strasbourg
Coupe de la Ligue: 1997, 2005
Coupe de France: 2001; runners-up 1995

References and notes

External links
 Profile

Living people
1948 births
Sportspeople from Ille-et-Vilaine
Association football defenders
French footballers
Valenciennes FC players
ASPV Strasbourg managers
RC Strasbourg Alsace players
French football managers
Ligue 1 players
Ligue 2 players
ASPV Strasbourg players
Espérance Sportive de Tunis managers
Ligue 1 managers
RC Strasbourg Alsace managers
Expatriate football managers in Tunisia
Footballers from Brittany